Didymocrea is a genus of fungi in the family Zopfiaceae; according to the 2007 Outline of Ascomycota, the placement in this family is uncertain. This is a monotypic genus, containing the single species Didymocrea sadasivanii.

References

External links
Index Fungorum

Pleosporales
Monotypic Dothideomycetes genera